Béla Tomka (born 8 May 1962 in Salgótarján) is a Hungarian historian and a professor at the Department of History, University of Szeged. His main research area is 20th century social and economic history with a special emphasis on international comparisons.

Studies and degrees 
He earned a master's degree in History and History of Eastern Europe at the University of Szeged, followed by postgraduate studies in economic and social history at the Corvinus University Budapest, in the United States (Minneapolis) and in Germany (Münster). He gained the dr. univ. degree in History in 1995, while a year later he received his PhD title in Economic and Social History. In his dissertation, later published as a book, he analyzed the relationship between banks and industry in Hungary at the turn of the 19th and 20th century, based on a wide range of archival sources. At the same time his aim was to reevaluate the arguments developed by R. Hilferding and A. Gerschenkron that have been influencing international economic history for many years. Tomka defended his habilitation thesis (‘venia legendi’) in 2004. In 2010 the Hungarian Academy of Sciences awarded him the Higher Doctorate (DSc) title. This dissertation aimed at determining the place of Hungary in the system of 20th-century European social and economic convergences and divergences with the systematic empirical analysis of several social and economic fields.

Research 
Within the social and economic history of 20th century Hungary and Europe, his research has centred on changes of population and family patterns and the welfare state. His latest works has focused on the comparative history of economic growth, consumption and the quality of life in East Central Europe. His research interest also encompasses the history of violence, propaganda and European integration.

Professional affiliations 
Since 1992 he is co-editor of Aetas, a Quarterly Journal of History and Related Disciplines, while being a member of other editorial boards of academic periodicals as well (Esély, a  Journal of Social Policy; The Hungarian Historical Review, Demográfia). In 2016, he was elected as the president of the István Hajnal Society of Social History, and he was re-elected in 2019. In 2010 he became the board member of the International Social History Association (ISHA, Amsterdam) and since 2011 he has been editor of the newsletter of this association. He is also an external founding member of the Social and Economic History PhD program at Eötvös University (ELTE, Budapest). He is the founder and head of the Doctoral Programme in Contemporary and Comparative History at the University of Szeged (2015). He is the leader of the MTA-SZTE-ELTE History of Globalization Research Group established by two universities and the Hungarian Academy of Sciences in 2019.

Publications and awards  
He is the author of 16 books and editor of several other volumes, as well as published a number of scholarly articles. Tomka has been invited by several research institutes and universities in Europe and North-America as research fellow and visiting professor, including institutions in Amsterdam, Mannheim, Berlin, Oxford, Edinburgh, Portland (OR), Regensburg, Hradec Králové and Jena. His major awards include the Bolyai Award for Outstanding Scholarly Contributions (2010) by the Bolyai Foundation Budapest, the Award of the Academy (for Distinguished Scholarly Achievement) endowed by the Hungarian Academy of Sciences in 2010, and Outstanding Academic Title 2013 Award by Choice, American Library Association (for A Social History of Twentieth-Century Europe, London and New York: Routledge, 2013). In 2021 he received the Best Publication Award in the field of humanities and social sciences from the University of Szeged

Selected works 
Austerities and Aspirations: A Comparative History of Growth, Consumption and Quality of Life in East Central Europe since 1945 (Budapest and New York: Central European University Press, 2020)
Európa társadalomtörténete a 20. században [A Social History of 20th Century Europe], Fully revised second edition (Budapest: Osiris Kiadó, 2020)
A Social History of Twentieth-Century Europe (London and New York: Routledge, 2013)
Gazdasági növekedés, fogyasztás és életminőség: Magyarország nemzetközi összehasonlításban az első világháborútól napjainkig (Budapest: Akadémiai Kiadó, 2011) [Economic Growth, Consumption and Quality of Life: Hungary in an International Comparison, 1918 to Present]
Welfare in East and West: Hungarian Social Security in an International Comparison, 1918-1990 (Berlin: Akademie Verlag, 2004)
Családfejlődés a 20. századi Magyarországon és Nyugat-Európában: konvergencia vagy divergencia? (Budapest: Osiris Kiadó, 2000) [Family Development in Hungary and Western Europe in the 20th Century: Convergence or Divergence?]

Further information 
 http://jelenkor.bibl.u-szeged.hu/prof-dr-tomka-bela/
 https://mta.hu/koztestuleti_tagok?PersonId=16647
 https://hist.bibl.u-szeged.hu/en/alprogramok/contemporary-history/
 https://globtort.bibl.u-szeged.hu/en/
 https://u-szeged.hu/sztehirek/2021-szeptember/orszagos-felsooktatasi

1962 births
Living people
People from Salgótarján
20th-century Hungarian historians
Corvinus University of Budapest alumni
21st-century Hungarian historians
Academic staff of the University of Szeged